Senator Garrett may refer to:

Avery Garrett (1916–1988), Washington State Senate
Daniel E. Garrett (1869–1932), Texas State Senate
Helen Garrett (1929–2006), Kentucky State Senate
Julian Garrett (born 1940), Iowa State Senate
Michael Garrett (politician) (born 1980s), North Carolina State Senate
Susan Garrett (born 1950), Illinois State Senate
Tom Garrett (Virginia politician) (born 1972), Virginia State Senate
Tommy Garrett (Nebraska politician) (born 1954), Nebraska State Senate
William A. Garrett (1854–1951), Virginia State Senate